Noé Gianetti (born 6 October 1989 in Lavertezzo) is a Swiss former professional racing cyclist. His father Mauro was also a professional cyclist.

Major results
2006
 1st Stage 2 Vuelta al Besaya
2012
 1st Chur–Arosa

References

External links

1989 births
Living people
Swiss male cyclists